The Fritz Bauer Prize is a prize awarded by the Humanist Union, established in 1968 in memory of its founder, Fritz Bauer, the longtime Attorney General of Hesse. The Humanist Union presents the award to those who have excelled in contributions to the humanization, liberalization and democratization of the judiciary.

Recipients
 1969 Helga Einsele 
 1970 Gustav Heinemann 
 1971 Birgitta Wolf
 1972 Emmy Diemer-Nicolaus 
 1973 Heinrich Hannover 
 1975 Helmut Ostermeyer 
 1976 Werner Hill
 1977 Heinz D. Stark 
 1978 Gerald Grünwald 
 1980 Peggy Parnass 
 1981 Ulrich Vultejus 
 1982 Ruth Leuze
 1983 Erich Küchenhoff 
 1984 Ulrich Finckh 
 1985 Rosi Wolf-Almanasreh
 1986 Ossip K. Flechtheim 
 1988 Eckart Spoo 
 1990 Liselotte Funcke 
 1993 Erwin Fischer 
 1995 Hans Lisken 
 1996 Hanne Vack und Klaus Vack 
 1997 Günter Grass 
 1999 Helga Seibert 
 2000 Regine Hildebrandt 
 2003 Dieter Schenk
 2004 Susanne von Paczensky
 2006 Burkhard Hirsch
 2008 Klaus Waterstradt
 2010 Helmut Kramer
 2012 Joachim Perels
 2014 Edward Snowden
 2016 Gefangenen-Gewerkschaft/Bundesweite Organisation
 2018 Hans-Christian Ströbele

External links 
 Official site

German awards
Awards established in 1968
1968 establishments in West Germany